Henrietta Carstairs (1777/78 – after 1817) was a British mountaineer and nanny. In 1817, she became the first person to climb the Sugarloaf Mountain in Rio de Janeiro, Brazil.

Sugarloaf Mountain
In 1817, Carstairs became the first person to climb the  Sugarloaf Mountain in Rio de Janeiro, Brazil. On reaching the top of the mountain, Carstairs placed a Union Jack on the mountain. According to legend, a patriotic Portuguese person later replaced the Union Jack with a Portuguese flag.

References

1770s births
19th-century deaths
British mountain climbers